Tolisa is a river in Bosnia and Herzegovina, a right tributary Sava. It is 56.2 kilometers long. It springs on the slopes of Trebava at an altitude of 440 meters, and flows into the Sava between Tolisa, Orašje and Domaljevac. The altitude of the estuary is 81 meters.

References

Rivers of Bosnia and Herzegovina